"I Wish You" is the third single released by Gloria Estefan from her tenth studio album Unwrapped. In 2003, promotional CD singles were sent to radio stations in the U.S. In 2004, the song was released as a CD single in Europe.

Meaning
Estefan said, "'I Wish You' is a power-ballad that shoots directly for the heart, pulling no punches. Telling someone that you love them, and wish them the best, even when they have wronged you, is often harder than when they have not. The concept, underscored beautifully, with sublime production, is a wistful goodbye that manages to empower the person who is being hurt the most."

Chart performance

Official versions 
Original versions
 Album Version — 3:52

Remixes
 DJ Joey Se' Revelation Anthem Radio Mix — 4:18
 DJ Joey Se' Revelation Anthem Mix — 10:26
 DJ Joey Se' Love Dub — 9:00

+The remixes for "I Wish You" were all commissioned to DJ Joey Se' but only the "Anthem Radio Mix" was released; it was issued on the EP Unwrapped: Remixes, aka "Sell Thru PPV (Bonus CD)" catalog #ESK-58488.

References

2003 singles
2004 singles
Gloria Estefan songs
Pop ballads
2003 songs
Songs written by Gloria Estefan
Epic Records singles